Isabel Oakeshott is a British political journalist.

Oakeshott was the political editor of The Sunday Times and is the co-author, with Michael Ashcroft, of an unauthorised biography of former British prime minister David Cameron, Call Me Dave, and of various other non-fiction titles, including White Flag? An examination of the UK's defence capability, also written with Ashcroft, Farmageddon, co-written with Philip Lymbery, and Pandemic Diaries, co-written with Matt Hancock, which provides an account of Hancock's tenure as the UK's Health Secretary during the COVID-19 pandemic.

Early life
Oakeshott attended St. George's School, Edinburgh, and Gordonstoun School in Moray, Scotland, before graduating in 1996 with a bachelor's degree in history from the University of Bristol.

Journalism career
Oakeshott began her career in journalism working in Scotland for the East Lothian Courier, Edinburgh Evening News, Daily Record, Sunday Mirror and Daily Mail, before returning to London and joining the Evening Standard as the Health correspondent. After three years, she moved to The Sunday Times in 2006 as deputy political editor, becoming political editor in 2010, and remained until 2014. She was awarded the title "Political Journalist of the Year" at the 2011 The Press Awards.

In 2013, while at The Sunday Times, she persuaded Vicky Pryce to implicate Pryce's estranged husband, former Liberal Democrat MP and Cabinet minister Chris Huhne, in having committed the offence of perverting the course of justice, leading to the case R v Huhne, and to both Pryce and Huhne being convicted and imprisoned.

Oakeshott has appeared as a panelist on the BBC's Daily Politics, as well as on BBC TV's Question Time, and has been a contributor to Sky News' Press Preview programme.

Between February 2016 and early 2017, Oakeshott was the Daily Mails political editor-at-large. In 2019, she wrote a series of articles for The Mail on Sunday based on leaked diplomatic memos written by the British Ambassador to the United States Sir Kim Darroch, in which he criticised the Trump administration. The leak led to his resignation.

In July 2019, The Guardian amended an article by its parliamentary sketch writer John Crace which contained a sentence that had potentially implied that Oakeshott obtained the Darroch emails by sleeping with Nigel Farage or Arron Banks. At the time, she called the comment "demonstrably false and extraordinarily sexist". The newspaper later published an apology.

In September 2021, GB News announced that she would be hosting a weekly show on the channel. She left to join TalkTV as its International Editor in April 2022. She earns a £250,000 salary for the role.

Writing career
Oakeshott has written a number of non-fiction books. Inside Out, co-written with, or ghostwritten for, Labour Party insider Peter Watt, is an inside look at New Labour. Farmageddon: the true cost of cheap meat, co-written with Philip Lymbery, addresses the effects of industrial-scale meat production.

Call Me Dave, co-written with Michael Ashcroft, is an unauthorised biography of former British prime minister David Cameron. One of the details in the book – that Cameron, during his university days, allegedly performed a sex act involving a dead pig – caused controversy upon publication. The unsubstantiated story was dependent on hearsay, and Oakeshott subsequently conceded her source could have been "deranged".

In 2018 she co-authored with Ashcroft a book on the state of the British Armed Forces, White Flag?.

The Bad Boys of Brexit is an inside account of the Leave.EU campaign during the run-up to the Brexit referendum, which she had ghostwritten for UKIP donor and Leave.EU funder Arron Banks. Oakeshott is a supporter of Brexit. She was in possession of details about Russia's cultivation and handling of Banks, that he was in regular contact with Russian officials from 2015 to 2017, but publicly downplayed Russian involvement with him.

Oakeshott helped former Health Secretary Matt Hancock write his book, Pandemic Diaries, The Inside Story Of Britain's Battle Against Covid. Published in December 2022, it was widely viewed as an attempt by Hancock to rehabilitate his reputation, following his ministerial resignation for breaking the UK's Covid lockdown rules with his mistress Gina Coladangelo, and criticism of his appearance on the ITV reality series I'm A Celebrity Get me Out Of Here, while he was still a serving and salaried MP.

Oakeshott then passed more than 100,000 of Hancock's WhatsApp messages to The Daily Telegraph, who began to publish them in February 2023 in a series called the Lockdown Files. She had been given the messages for the purpose of using them to help write Hancock's book and she was subject to a contractual confidentiality restriction. The files revealed details of the health and public order decision making during the COVID-19 lockdown, and various political figures and civil servants including Hancock himself, then Prime Minister Boris Johnson, the UK's most senior civil servant, the Cabinet Secretary Simon Case, Chief Medical Officer, Chris Whitty and Chancellor of the Exchequer, Rishi Sunak. 

Oakeshott said that leaking the messages was in the public interest. Oakeshott said Hancock sent a "threatening" message alleging she had made a "big mistake" and added "He's since followed through with threats of legal action."

Personal life
Oakeshott married Nigel Rosser and has three children. In 2018, she was reported to be in a relationship with businessman and future Reform UK leader Richard Tice.

She is related to life peer Matthew Oakeshott.

Bibliography
 
 
 
 Ghostwriter of

References

External links
 
 

Living people
Alumni of the University of Bristol
English non-fiction writers
English political journalists
English political writers
London Evening Standard people
People educated at St George's School, Edinburgh
People educated at Gordonstoun
The Sunday Times people